Briatte is a surname. Notable people with the surname include:

 François Briatte (1805–1877), Swiss politician
 Hugues Briatte (born 1990), French rugby union player